Toni Huttunen (born 12 January 1973) is a Finnish retired footballer who last played for MyPa. He earned 11 caps for the Finnish national side between 1994 and 2002.

External links

1973 births
Living people
Finnish footballers
Finnish expatriate footballers
Finland international footballers
Myllykosken Pallo −47 players
Veikkausliiga players
Association football defenders
People from Kuusankoski
Sportspeople from Kymenlaakso